
The environmental movement in South Africa traces its history from the early beginnings of conservation, to the rise of radicalism and activism amongst local ecologists. Before the Chernobyl disaster and the fall of the Berlin Wall, there were very few green activist groups in the country. Koeberg Alert and the Dolphin Action and Protection Group are probably two of the oldest post-conservation groups.

While most early conservationists, with few exceptions, implicated themselves in the apartheid system, groups such as Earthlife Africa were consciously aware of their role as nurturers of freedom and human rights as well as the rights of the earth and animal kingdom. The Cape Town Ecology Group for example, openly campaigned for political freedoms with a platform that "ecologised politics and politicised ecology".

During apartheid while political parties were banned, environmental groups served as an outlet for activism and political expression. In Durban, the Environmental Justice Network, sprung up alongside ant-apartheid issues that affected the environment as well as the rights of workers. While many radical environmentalists were later absorbed into the governing African National Congress, some toyed with the formation of a political party that would represent green interests.

Timeline

Colonial Era
1918: Native Farmers Association founded;
1926: Wildlife Society of South Africa founded

Apartheid Era
1955: Congress_of_the_People_(1955) held at Kliptown. Freedom Charter includes article on agrarian & environmental rights, in particular 'save the soil'.
1973: Endangered Wildlife Trust founded
1976 Koeberg Alert founded following the decision to site South Africa's first nuclear power station only 30 kms from Cape Town
1977: The Dolphin Action & Protection Group founded with the motto and policy 'Dolphins Should Be Free'.
1983: Koeberg Alert reconstituted, "broadens the focus of the protest" to place the entire nuclear issue "within its social, political and economic context."
1984: Natsoc, a nature society founded
1986: Chernobyl disaster
1987: Cape Town Ecology Group founded; with motto: 'Free the Humans'
1988: Earthlife Africa formed; Khanyisa, environmental awareness organisation founded in townships of Langa, Nyanga, Guguletu and Khayelitsha
1989: Earthlife Africa exposes mercury poisoning of workers at Thor Chemicals; Kagenna Magazine is published; Green Action Forum founded by Greg Knill
1990: A fishing industry campaign by the Food and Allied Workers Union links workers issues to the environment;
1991: First National Conference on Environment and Development; Environmental Monitoring Group releases a document "Towards Sustainable Development in South Africa"; General Magnus Malan takes over as new Minister of Water Affairs and Forestry; Bev Geach of the Weekly Mail publishes The Green Pages, a directory of environmental groups
1992: Earthlife Africa pressurizes the government for an inquiry into asbestos related deaths. Environmental Justice Networking Forum (EJNF) formed at an ELA conference.
1993: Group for Environmental Monitoring (GEM) founded.

Post-Apartheid Era
1994: After South Africa's first democratic election, environmental rights submitted for debate to the Constitutional Assembly.
1995: eThekwini ECOPEACE founded
1996: South Africa's Bill of Rights proclaims: "Everyone has the right to an environment that is not harmful to their health or well-being."
1997: The ANC government moves to provide lead-free petrol as one of its first pro-environment policies
1998: The Truth Commission hears about asbestos-related deaths from mining
1999: Groundwork (GW), a non-profit, environmental justice service and development organization founded by 3 ex-EJNF activists
2000: South Durban Community Environmental Alliance (SDCEA) formed; eThekwini ECOPEACE wins one seat in the eThekwini Municipal Council, the first time a Green Party of any sort in South Africa has won at the polls
2002: Rio+10 World Summit on Sustainable Development held in Johannesburg; Earthlife launches the People's Environmental Centre, the Greenhouse.
2003: Asbestos Relief Trust (ART) set up, and the Kgalagadi Relief Trust (KRT), both of which evaluate claims and provide compensation for qualified claimants. A media statement, indicates that the ban on the use of asbestos and asbestos-related materials was "well overdue." National Energy Caucus founded.
2004: Marthinus van Schalkwyk appointed as Minister of Environmental Affairs and Tourism
2006: Eskom, South Africa's national energy utility issues energy-saving lightbulbs to consumers as part of a "demand-side" energy-reduction campaign.
Dept of Environmental Affairs and Tourism holds hearings on nuclear power. First evidence of contamination and worker-related deaths caused b exposure to radiation.
2009: South Africa participates in the Copenhagen Climate Change round.
2010: SA Government announces mothballing of PBMR. Edna Molewa appointed Minister of Environment under Jacob Zuma.
2011: South Africa hosts COP17 in Durban, a new framework emerges. Allied Climate & Health Conference releases "Durban Declaration" declaring a health emergency, signed by 250 medical professionals and public health organisations.
2015: South Africa hosts South African International Renewable Energy Conference.
2016: Vukani Environmental Justice Movement formed in Mpumalanga Province.
2019: Barbara Creecy sworn in as new Minister of Environment under Ramaphosa.
2022: March, "Deadly Air" case heard in South Africa. Court confirms the constitutional right of the country’s citizens to an environment that isn’t harmful to their health. This includes the right to clean air, as exposure to air pollution affects human health. 
September, Shell 'Wild Coast' Ocean Exploration Case heard. High Court in Makhanda ruled that Shell’s exploration right to conduct seismic surveys on the Wild Coast of South Africa was granted unlawfully and therefore set it aside.

See also
 Federation of Green Parties of Africa
 Anti-nuclear movement

References

Political movements in South Africa
Environment of South Africa
South Africa